ATL may refer to:

Places
 Atlanta, a city in the U.S. state of Georgia
 Hartsfield–Jackson Atlanta International Airport (IATA airport code)
 Peachtree station (Amtrak station code)
 Attleborough railway station, located in Norfolk, England (National Rail code)

Media
 ATL (film), a 2006 film set in the city of Atlanta, Georgia, United States
 Across the Line (radio show), a BBC Northern Ireland music brand
 ATL (band), an R&B boy band
 Above the Law (group), a Los Angeles–based rap group
 All Time Low, a pop punk band from Lutherville-Timonium, Maryland
 Among the Living, an album by heavy metal band Anthrax

Technology
 Advanced Tactical Laser, a US military program to mount a laser weapon on an aircraft for use against ground targets
 Americans for Technology Leadership, an organization that advocates limited government regulation of technology
 Active Template Library, from Microsoft
 ATLAS Transformation Language, a QVT model transformation language for model-driven engineering

Other
 Adult T-cell leukemia, a rare cancer of the immune system's own T-cells
 Alternating-time Temporal Logic, a branching-time temporal logic that naturally describes computations of multi-agent system and multiplayer games
 The Appropriate Technology Library, a library on 29 subject areas of small scale, do-it-yourself technology
 Anti-Terrorism Law, a law that aims to prevent, prohibit, and penalize terrorism in the Philippines
 Association of Teachers and Lecturers, an education union in the UK
 Atlanta, Georgia's major professional sports teams:
 Atlanta Braves, the city's Major League Baseball team
 Atlanta Falcons, the city's National Football League team
 Atlanta Hawks, the city's National Basketball Association team
 Atlanta United FC, a Major League Soccer team
 Avion Très Léger or Robin ATL, a light aircraft manufactured by Avions Pierre Robin
 The ATL proposed rebrand of Metropolitan Atlanta Rapid Transit Authority (MARTA)
 Azienda Trasporti Livornese, former Livorno bus transport company

See also 

 
 
 
 Above the line (disambiguation)
 alt.* hierarchy
 Atlantis
 Atlas
 Atlatl
 Dr. Atl (1875–1964), Mexican painter and writer
 ATLS (disambiguation)
 TL (disambiguation)
 at1 (disambiguation)
 ati (disambiguation)